The Shadow of Weng-Chiang is an original novel written by David A. McIntee and based on the long-running British science fiction television series Doctor Who. It is a sequel to the 1977 serial The Talons of Weng-Chiang, featuring the Fourth Doctor, the first Romana, and K-9 Mark II.

Summary
The hunt for the fourth segment of the Key to Time brings the TARDIS crew to 1930s Shanghai: the Tongs pursue their own agenda in the city's illegal clubs, while the Japanese Empire looms in the background. Manipulated by a mysterious enemy, the Doctor must follow the Dragon Path - a side effect of a terrible experiment from the future. And who is the beautiful Hsien-Ko and the small child that accompanies her?

Plot
While stealing a priceless work of art from the Palace Theatre Museum, thief Lucas Seyton, the Fallen Angel, stumbles across another robbery in progress. He is unable to prevent the thieves from killing the caretaker and making off with another exhibit, but he does find a clue: a matchbook from the Club Do-San in Shanghai, which is owned by a friend of his. In Shanghai, policeman Sung-Chi Li spots a beautiful young woman with a small child leaving an opium den he has just raided but loses them outside. Inside the den, he finds the body of a European male who appears to have been stabbed to death, but the blood trail which indicates he was killed somewhere other than this room leads straight to a solid wall. While searching the den for further clues, Li finds a dockworker's pass for Gongpinglu Wharf and decides to lead a team there to investigate further. Meanwhile, the vigilante Yan Cheh follows the fleeing woman Hsien-Ko and her associate Kwok to the Nang Tao airfield, where he loses sight of them; however, in his identity as the club owner Woo, he learns that Kwok is to meet with a German named Vogler at Gongpinglu Wharf later that night, and decides to investigate in person.

The Tracer directs the TARDIS to Shanghai in the year 1934, but it is giving off very strange readings, and the three segments which the Doctor and Romana have already collected are glowing in an unusual manner. The Doctor, questioning whether two segments of the Key would be located on the same planet, follows the trace to Nang Tao airport, where they find an abandoned car with blood in the back seat and a knife made of an alloy that has not yet been invented on Earth. The Doctor soon determines that the Tracer is picking up another source of chronon radiation which is not related to the Key to Time, but since he can't locate the fourth Segment until the interference is dealt with, he and Romana must remain to investigate. They trace the radiation source to Gongpinglu Wharf, where Li is about to move in on Kwok and Hsien-Ko as they purchase smuggled German weapons from Vogler. Their unexpected arrival startles Li into ordering his team into action prematurely, and Hsien-Ko and Kwok thus escape, killing Vogler to prevent him from identifying them. Li arrests the Doctor and Romana, and when the Doctor's fingerprints prove to match some found on the abandoned car, he charges them with the murder of the man from the opium den. The dead man has now been positively identified as the caretaker of the Palace Museum in London—which is impossible, as he was spotted alive in London one hour before his body was found in Shanghai.

The Doctor summons K9 for help, and K9 arrives just in time to save them from bandits who materialize out of thin air in the police cells and attempt to kill them. The Doctor studies the stunned bandits and finds that they are all footsoldiers from the Tong of the Black Scorpion and that they are carrying geomantic compasses embossed with the blood of a young woman. The Doctor modifies K9 to seek the signature of the chronon radiation he is seeking, and K9 leads him and Romana to the opium den, just as Kwok arrives to retrieve the Tong's abandoned altar and Li arrives in search of more clues. The Doctor and Romana steal a car to pursue Kwok, and Li sets off in pursuit of them all. Kwok uses his geomantic compass to transport his truck elsewhere instantaneously, but the pursuing cars are swept up in the currents behind him and the chase continues, until a Japanese bomber strafes the city and the Doctor's "borrowed" car is buried under the rubble. Li pulls the Doctor out of the wreckage and arrests him, leaving Romana for dead, but Romana is rescued by Woo and taken back to his nightclub to recover. Woo explains that as a vigilante he protects the ordinary people of Shanghai both from the Tongs and their corrupt government. Thanks to his friend Lucas Seyton he has learned of the Black Scorpion's apparent ability to cross great distances instantly, and he needs to know how this is possible. Romana agrees to help him, and she releases K9 from the wreckage of their car and sends him to inform the Doctor of their new ally.

Li questions the Doctor and comes to believe in his innocence, but he is still a stickler for law and order and has no intention of releasing the Doctor until he has been found innocent by a court of law. Nevertheless, he concedes that only the Doctor can help him learn how the Tong have learned to travel as they do. When K9 tracks down the Doctor, the Doctor has him analyse the genetic structure of the blood on the geomantic compass and locate its source. K9 leads the Doctor and Li to a mansion outside the city, where they are captured while trying to break in, and are brought before Hsien-Ko, who seems to recognize the Doctor, or at least his reputation. Knowing him to be dangerous, but believing that he can be made to understand why she is doing what she is, she orders Kwok to take him through the Dragon Paths and strand him in the Orkney Islands; by the time he returns to Shanghai by more conventional means, her plan will be complete. Kwok agrees to do so, but he is in love with Hsien-Ko and intends to kill the Doctor to ensure that he does not pose a threat to her. Meanwhile, Hsien-Ko continues to lay the groundwork for her great plan, stealing Japanese military supplies and transporting them through the Dragon Paths, and using the creature she stole from the Palace Museum to murder a Japanese military official and thus delay the advance of a brigade which would have threatened her position near the Jade Emperor.

The Doctor and Li are taken to a quarry where the Tong is moving their stolen armaments through one of the Dragon Paths, but they manage to overpower their guard and escape. Li returns to the mansion to arrest Hsien-Ko but is attacked by the thing she stole from the Palace Museum, the killer automaton known as Mr Sin, and barely escapes with his life. Li flees back to the quarry, where he hides aboard a truck and is transported to the Jade Emperor, the temple at the sacred mountain of T'ai Shan. There, he is recaptured, but Hsien-Ko decides to keep him alive as a hostage to ensure the Doctor's good behaviour should he show up again. She has also stolen the TARDIS to ensure that the Doctor cannot escape. The Doctor returns to Shanghai, where he finds his way to Woo's nightclub and is reunited with Romana. Woo has heard Kwok's name mentioned in a conversation about the movement of a Japanese brigade, and the Doctor takes them to question the colonel in charge, only to be recaptured by Hsien-Ko. Hsien-Ko takes Romana to the Jade Emperor as another hostage while leaving Mr Sin to guard the Doctor and Woo, but before leaving she tells the Doctor that she is the daughter of Li H'Sen Chang, a former servant of Magnus Greel and that despite appearances, she is over 65 years old.

The Doctor and Woo overpower Sin and their guards, but as they escape K9 reports that he has detected the presence of uranium in the vicinity. The Doctor realizes that Hsien-Ko intends to use a nuclear reactor to increase the power of the Dragon Paths, and works out how they are being used. The arrival of Greel's Time Cabinet must have irradiated the young Hsien-Ko with chronon particles, explaining her slow ageing; and the zygma beam which powers the Cabinet is still intersecting Earth's natural telluric currents, enabling Hsien-Ko to tap into them and move instantly along their paths. If Hsien-Ko focuses a nuclear reaction through the telluric currents, she will short out the zygma beam and release fifty years of accumulated energy—enough to use the Dragon Paths to travel anywhere in time and space. But in doing so she will cause the Time Cabinet to materialize here and now, creating a temporal paradox centred upon Hsien-Ko herself and unleashing Magnus Greel upon the world of the 1930s.

Romana is surprised when Hsien-Ko allows her to move freely about T'ai Shan, but Hsien-Ko is convinced that her cause is honourable and believes that Romana will come to understand this if she is allowed to find out the truth for herself. Hsien-Ko is using a nuclear reactor she has constructed from the stolen Japanese supplies to supplement the mountain's natural piezoelectric qualities, the very qualities which first drew the Time Cabinet to the Temple of the Jade Emperor and convinced the Tong that his materialization heralded the arrival of Weng-Chiang. Hsien-Ko has promised the Tong that she will restore their god to them, but she admits to Romana that she knows the truth; Magnus Greel is a madman who deceived her father, and it was only due to the Doctor's intervention that Chang died an honourable death. But if this is so, why is she trying to rescue him?

As the Doctor and Woo prepare to set off for T'ai Shan, the Doctor realizes that Woo is Japanese, and Woo admits that he wishes to overthrow the military officers who now rule his country. He and the Doctor charter a plane to take them to the railway which leads to T'ai Shan, and on the way, they and K9 fight off another attack from Mr Sin, who uses the Dragon Paths to board their plane mid-flight. When Mr Sin returns, Hsien-Ko sends a squadron of guards through the Dragon Paths to the airfield where the Doctor and Woo are about to land, but Romana accompanies the guards and helps the Doctor and Woo to fight them off. Romana then leads the Doctor, Woo and K9 to T'ai Shen, where they are recaptured in any case. Woo is taken to be locked up while Hsien-Ko shows the Doctor her achievements and explains her true agenda; knowing Greel to be an unworthy god who used and discarded Chang, she intends to avenge her father's death by torturing Greel for eternity. The Doctor tries to convince her that she will only succeed in creating a temporal paradox that will destroy her, and urges her not to squander her impressive intellect on a misplaced desire for revenge. Hsien-Ko, infuriated, orders Kwok to lock up the Doctor and Romana as well. The reaction has begun and is now self-sustaining; soon she will be able to intercept the zygma beam and bring Greel to her. Meanwhile, K9, left at the base of the mountain, must climb the 7000 stone steps to the temple to rejoin the Doctor and Romana.

Li kills his guard and escapes, but instead of contacting his superiors, he attempts to contact the Japanese to tell them what he has discovered. He has served the Japanese since 1932, seeing in their society order and structure he desires in his own. Sin locates him and cuts the power cable to the transmitter, but while trying to escape Li strikes Sin down with the live end of the cable. Hsien-Ko, momentarily stunned by the surge of power through her link to Sin, sends Kwok to find and kill Li but then discovers that due to the power surge she can no longer control Sin's bloodlust. Kwok and his men run into Sin in the corridors, and Kwok is forced to flee for his life when Sin begins slaughtering them indiscriminately. Sin then pursues Li to the turbine control room, where Li, unaware of the danger, fires at him with a German grenade launcher and hits the reactor turbines. As the reaction starts to run out of control, Li flees and warns the approaching guards, none of whom are aware of the situation, that Hsien-Ko has betrayed them. As the reactor control room begins to fill with radioactive steam, many of the guards turn on each other, and a battle breaks out between members of the Tong, who no longer understand what is happening or who can be trusted.

The Doctor and Romana escape and join Hsien-Ko in the reactor control room, where she is shamed when the Doctor risks his life to repair the damage and prevent the reactor from becoming a nuclear bomb. He succeeds but finds that the chain-reaction explosions have damaged the structure of the mountain and its natural piezoelectric properties will now be enough to divert Greel's Time Cabinet. He and Romana try to return to the TARDIS, but are attacked by Mr Sin on the way; however, this time they are able to destroy it. Despite the Doctor's efforts to convince her otherwise, Hsien-Ko still intends to punish Greel for his deeds and goes to the Temple with Kwok to await his arrival, but just as the Doctor had predicted, the arrival of the Time Cabinet creates a temporal paradox centred upon Hsien-Ko. The Doctor uses the TARDIS to expel the Time Cabinet back into the zygma beam, and it completes its journey but the temporal feedback is shorted through Hsien-Ko's body, and she is incinerated before the horrified Kwok's eyes. Kwok tries to kill the Doctor, but K9 arrives and stuns him in the nick of time. Woo encounters and shoots Li, but he has become sickened of violence and decides to spend the rest of his days as an ordinary nightclub owner. The Doctor uses the TARDIS to bury the reactor under fast-drying concrete so the Japanese will not find it, and he and Romana set off on their quest once again, as Hsien-Ko's death means that the chronon interference has cleared up. But Kwok remains alive, and, blaming the Doctor for Hsien-Ko's death, he vows to avenge her.

References

1996 British novels
1996 science fiction novels
Virgin Missing Adventures
Fourth Doctor novels
Novels by David A. McIntee
Fiction set in 1937